Joseph Ma Xue-sheng (September 16, 1923 – February 8, 2013) was a Catholic bishop.

Born in China, Ma Xue-sheng was ordained a priest  on April 3, 1957. On April 24, 1988, he was clandestinely consecrated auxiliary bishop of the Diocese of Zhoucun. From 1997 until his death he was a bishop ordinary at the same diocese.

References

1923 births
2013 deaths
21st-century Roman Catholic bishops in China
People from Zouping
20th-century Roman Catholic bishops in China
Chinese Roman Catholic bishops